A monofluoride is a chemical compound with one fluoride per formula unit.  For a binary compound, this is the formula XF.

Organofluorine compounds
Common monofluoride are organofluorine compounds such as methyl fluoride and fluorobenzene.

Inorganic compounds
All the alkali metals form monofluorides.  All have the sodium chloride (rock salt) structure and are soluble in water and even some alcohols. Because the fluoride anion is highly basic, many alkali metal fluorides form bifluorides with the formula MHF2. Sodium and potassium bifluorides are significant to the chemical industry. Among other monofluorides, only silver(I) and thallium(I) fluorides are well-characterized.  Both are very soluble, unlike the other halides of those metals.

Selected inorganic monofluorides

Examples of the monofluorides include:

Metal monofluorides

Aluminium monofluoride, an elusive species with the formula AlF
Caesium fluoride
Copper monofluoride
Lithium fluoride
Mercury monofluoride
Potassium fluoride
Rubidium fluoride
Silver fluoride
Sodium fluoride
Thallium monofluoride

Nonmetal monofluorides

Boron monofluoride or fluoroborylene has the formula BF
Bromine monofluoride, a liquid interhalogen compound with formula BrF
Carbon monofluoride (CF, CFx, or (CF)x), also called polycarbon monofluoride
Chlorine monofluoride, a volatile interhalogen compound with formula ClF
Iodine monofluoride, a chocolate-brown solid compound with formula IF
Hydrogen fluoride, a liquid or gas with boiling point at about 20 °C, HF
Nitrogen monofluoride, a metastable compound with formula NF

References

Bibliography

External links

Fluorides